The Pallbearer is a 1996 American romantic comedy film co-written and directed by Matt Reeves in his directorial debut and starring David Schwimmer, Gwyneth Paltrow, Toni Collette, Michael Vartan, Michael Rapaport, and Barbara Hershey. It was screened in the Un Certain Regard section at the 1996 Cannes Film Festival.

Plot

Tom Thompson, 25, still lives with his mother. A former high school classmate's mother, Ruth Abernathy, calls to say his "best friend," Bill, committed suicide, asking him to give his eulogy. Not remembering him, nevertheless he agrees to be a pallbearer. Meanwhile, his high school crush, Julie DeMarco, reappears in town.

At the funeral, Tom's vague and impersonal eulogy confuses the Abernathys and amuses his friends. Julie, upset at their disrespect, tries to leave as they carry Bill's casket out of the church. Tom drags the casket and the rest of the pallbearers after Julie. Asking if she knew Bill; she admits she didn't but was saddened to see him in the casket. Asking her out upsets Bill's relatives, so he's forcefully relieved of his duties as pallbearer. Visibly upset, Ruth tells Tom he is in Bill's will.

Afterwards, Tom calls Julie and she requests Scott and Cynthia come along for a double date. At dinner, Julie and Scott click, while conversation between Tom and Julie is stilted. Scott mentions that Tom still lives with his mother.

Disgusted by Scott, Tom reluctantly drives Julie home. Arriving, she reveals she remembers him in high school. As Tom leans in for a kiss, Julie turns and they knock heads. She apologizes for giving off the wrong signals, as she is moving away.

Rejected at his second job interview, Tom goes to Ruth's to help pack Bill's room. Looking through old photos of Bill, they kiss and have sex. She tells him about Bill's father, who died in the war. Tom tells Ruth about Bill's fictitious love interest based completely on his own infatuation with Julie, and they continue to see each other.

Tom spies on Julie working at a record store from his car. One day, at closing time, he sees her let Scott into the store, who then kisses her. When Scott sees Tom, he drives off.

The next morning, Julie tells Tom about Scott's kiss, not knowing he had witnessed it. Reminiscing about high school band, she tells him she wants to just drive away for a year to be on her own. Julie then invites Tom to a concert.

Arriving at Ruth's, Tom is rushed to an Abernathy family gathering. He realizes Ruth had overheard him talking to Julie about their date later that evening. When Tom's car breaks down, Julie finds Ruth's charm bracelet, so he tells her he has been helping Bill Abernathy's mother since the funeral. She mistakenly assumes it's an innocent friendship.

After a tow truck takes Tom and Julie back to his house, as he sneaks into his mother's room to get her car keys, she enters his room. Tom reveals he once wanted to dance with her at a school dance and she kisses him. Falling into Tom's bed, Ruth calls, knowing Julie is there with him.

When Tom seeks advice from Brad, he suggests mailing the bracelet with a letter to end things with Ruth. He does so and continues dating Julie. On her birthday, she asks him to meet her parents. That morning, Tom sees Ruth with the envelope and sneaks away. At brunch with Julie's parents, her father disapproves of them. As Tom begs Julie to not leave for a year, Ruth barges into the restaurant, humiliating him.

At Brad's bachelor party, Tom makes a scene, telling him not to marry Lauren. Calling her an albatross around his neck and that Scott agrees. The next day, Scott apologizes to Tom and they reconcile. Talking about their childhood, they realize there was another Tom who moved away after junior high. So Tom brings the other Tom to Ruth, who appreciates the gesture to reminisce about her son. They both realize they needed someone at the time, Ruth mourning her son and Tom pining for his childhood crush.

At Brad's wedding, Tom patches his friendship with Brad approving of his marriage to Lauren, as Scott and Cynthia also reconcile. Tom also gives Julie his car keys for her trip. She hints that she wants to dance.

Tom gets a job and moves into Julie's apartment while she is on her trip.

Cast
 David Schwimmer as Tom Thompson
 Gwyneth Paltrow as Julie DeMarco
 Toni Collette as Cynthia
 Michael Vartan as Scott
 Michael Rapaport as Brad Schorr
 Barbara Hershey as Ruth Abernathy
 Carol Kane as Mrs. Thompson
 Bitty Schram as Lauren
 Jean De Baer as Suzanne DeMarco
 Mark Margolis as Philip DeMarco
 Elizabeth Franz as Aunt Lucille

Production
Miramax Films won an auction in October 1994 for the spec script written by Reeves and Jason Katims, initially paying $400,000. Reeves was known for co-writing Under Siege 2: Dark Territory and Katims as a story editor on the television show My So-Called Life. J. J. Abrams supervised the writers during the writing process and co-produced the film.

Reception

Box office
The Pallbearer opened at number 9 at the US box office in its opening weekend (5/3-5) with $2,319,236. By the end of its run, the film had made $7,656,388 in the United States and Canada.

Critical reception
The review aggregation site Rotten Tomatoes reported that 48% of critics have given the film a positive review based on 21 reviews, with an average rating of 5.1/10. The consensus summarizes: "Between a dark comedy and a romantic one, The Pallbearer confounds, and David Schwimmer's puppy dog eyes can't save the procession from going six feet under."

References

External links
 
 
 

1996 films
1996 directorial debut films
1996 independent films
1996 romantic comedy films
1990s black comedy films
1990s English-language films
American black comedy films
American independent films
American romantic comedy films
Films about suicide
Films directed by Matt Reeves
Films produced by J. J. Abrams
Films scored by Stewart Copeland
Films with screenplays by Matt Reeves
Miramax films
1990s American films